This is a list of Billboard magazine's ranking of the year's top country singles of 1963. 

The year's No. 1 country single was "Still" by Bill Anderson. "Act Naturally" by Buck Owens ranked second, and "Ring of Fire" by Johnny Cash ranked third. 

Patsy Cline died in March 1963 and had three singles that made the year-end list: "Sweet Dreams (of You)" (No. 23), "Leavin' on Your Mind" (No. 30), and "Faded Love" (No. 31).

See also
List of Hot Country Singles number ones of 1963
List of Billboard Hot 100 number ones of 1963
1963 in country music

Notes

References

1963 record charts
Billboard charts
1963 in American music